Van Lierde is a surname. Notable people with the surname include:

Luc Van Lierde (born 1969), Belgian triathlete
Petrus Canisius van Lierde (1907–1995), Dutch Roman Catholic priest and theologian
Remy Van Lierde (1915–1990), Belgian World War II flying ace

See also
9859 Van Lierde, main-belt asteroid

Surnames of Dutch origin